The 2008 All-Ireland Senior Camogie Championship—known as the Gala All-Ireland Senior Camogie Championship for sponsorship reasons—was the high point of the 2008 season. The championship was won by Cork who defeated Galway by a five-point margin in the final. The championship was played between June 1 and September 14, 2008. The format was as follows: seven county teams entered. Each team played all of the others once, earning 2 points for a win and 1 for a draw. The top four teams qualified for the semi-finals.

Group stages
Substitute Lourda Kavanagh’s late goal helped Galway spring a surprise against Cork in the group stages by 1-9 to 0-8 at Páirc Ui Rinn. Cork went on to gain revenge when the same teams med again in the All-Ireland final, the second time a group result had been reversed in the final in the three years since the round-robin format had been introduced into the championship in 2006.

Results

Group stage
The cross table below summarises the group stages, which were played from June 1 to August 3, 2008. Away results are italicised.

Final stages

References

External links
 Reports of 2008 All Ireland final in  Independent, Irish Times  Examiner, Reaction in Examiner
 Video highlights of 2008 championship Part One,  Part Two and Part three
 Video of 2008 All Ireland finals preview
 Video of 2008 All Ireland semi-final Wexford v Galway
Results on camogie.ie (MS Excel document)
 Official Camogie Website
  Review of championship in On The Ball Official Camogie Magazine

2008
2008
All-Ireland Senior Camogie Championship